Nicole Cheri Wright  (born 12 August 1972) is a Canadian soccer player who played as a goalkeeper for the Canada women's national soccer team. She was part of the team at the 1999 FIFA Women's World Cup.

She played for the Washington Freedom in the Women's United Soccer Association in 2003.

References

External links
 
 University of Victoria Sports Hall of Fame profile

1972 births
Living people
Canadian women's soccer players
Canada women's international soccer players
Place of birth missing (living people)
1999 FIFA Women's World Cup players
Women's association football goalkeepers
Women's Professional Soccer players
Washington Freedom players
Women's United Soccer Association players
Victoria Vikes athletes